Piotr Indyk is Thomas D. and Virginia W. Cabot Professor in the Theory of Computation Group at the Computer Science and Artificial Intelligence Laboratory, Massachusetts Institute of Technology.

Academic biography
Indyk received the Magister (MA) degree from the University of Warsaw in 1995 and a PhD in computer science from Stanford University in 2000 under the supervision of Rajeev Motwani.  In 2000, Indyk joined MIT where he currently holds the title of Thomas D. and Virginia W. Cabot Professor in the Department of Electrical Engineering and Computer Science.

Research
Indyk's research focuses primarily on computational geometry in high-dimensions, streaming algorithms, and computational learning theory.  He has made a range of contributions to these fields, particularly in the study of low-distortion embeddings, algorithmic coding theory, and geometric and combinatorial pattern matching.  He has also made contributions to the theory of compressed sensing.  His work on algorithms for computing the Fourier transform of signals with sparse spectra faster than the Fast Fourier transform algorithm was selected by MIT Technology Review as a TR10 Top 10 Emerging Technology in 2012.

Awards and honors
In 2000, Indyk was awarded the Best Student Paper Award at the Symposium on Foundations of Computer Science (FOCS).  In 2002 he received the Career Award from the National Science Foundation, and in 2003 he received a Packard Fellowship from the Packard Foundation and a Sloan Fellowship from the Alfred P. Sloan Foundation. He was a co-winner of the 2012 Paris Kanellakis Award from the Association for Computing Machinery for his work on locality-sensitive hashing. In 2013, he was named a Simons Investigator by the Simons Foundation. In 2015, he was named Fellow of ACM "For contributions to high-dimensional geometric computing, streaming/sketching algorithms, and the Sparse Fourier Transform".

References

External links
 Piotr Indyk's Homepage
 List of Publications

Theoretical computer scientists
Polish computer scientists
Stanford University alumni
Massachusetts Institute of Technology faculty
Researchers in geometric algorithms
Fellows of the Association for Computing Machinery
Year of birth missing (living people)
Living people
Simons Investigator